Larger outlaw motorcycle clubs have been known to form support clubs, also known as "satellite clubs", which operate each with their own distinctive club name but are subservient to the Motorcycle Club that has established them. They offer support to the principle club in a number of different ways. This can include providing them with protection, financing them or violent acts at the discretion of the larger club. Logos and insignias of support clubs displayed as patches on biker vests may bear a similar color scheme reminiscent of the logo belonging to the principle club as a way of signifying their allegiance.

With the Hells Angels Motorcycle Club being a worldwide force that has 475 chapters in 62 countries, their influence has allowed them to maintain and produce a number of support clubs around the globe.

International
 Devils Choice MC, in Denmark, Iceland, Norway, Spain and Sweden.
 Iron Workers MC, in the United States and Canada.
 Red Devils MC, in nearly 20 countries.

Belgium
 Egmond MC
 Globalriders MC

Brazil
 Discipulos MC
 Rising Devils MC
 Rudes MC
 Red Pigs MC

Bulgaria
 Red Riders MC

Canada
 103 Riders MC
 Apollos MC
 Bad Disciples MC    
 Brotherhood MC                           
Darksiders Motorcycle Club
 Death Riders
 Devil's Army MC, in Campbell River, British Columbia
 Devil's Child
 Devils Ghosts MC
 Dirty Bikers MC, in Maple Ridge, B.C.
 Dirty Few MC
 Evil Ones MC
 Fallen Saints MC
 Gate Keepers MC
 Helles Nation
 Heretics MC
 Highlanders MC
 Horsemen Brotherhood MC
 Hooligans MC - Sudbury, Ontario
https://northernontario.ctvnews.ca/seven-people-from-northeastern-ontario-arrested-in-project-skylark-1.4538008
https://www.sudbury.com/police/hooligans-motorcycle-club-member-charged-after-police-search-unlicensed-bar-2025870
https://www.thesudburystar.com/news/local-news/two-men-shot-during-altercation-on-the-kingsway
 Inca MC (defunct)
 Jesters MC
 Katt Sass MC
 Langford Savages MC, in Langford, British Columbia
 Longriders MC (Mirabel, Québec)
 Los Diablos MC
 Maverick MC
 MinotauresMC
 Niners MC
 Rockers MC (defunct)
 Satan's Angels MC, in British Columbia (patched over in 1983)
 Savages MC
 Shadow Club MC
 Stolen Souls MC
 Syndicate MC
 Teamsters' Horsemen MC
 Throttle Lockers MC
 Zig Zag Crew

Chile
 Octanates Motoclub
 Vampiros MC

Denmark
 AK81
 Avengers MC
 Mad Hatters MC

Egypt
Skull Pharaos Motorcycle Club

Estonia
League Motorcycle Club

Finland
 Barley Motorcycle Club
 Cannonball Motorcycle Club (until 1996)
 Overkill Motorcycle Club

France
Apocalypse Riders
Buccaneers
Club de Clichy Motorcycle Club
Road Cat's Motorcycle Club

Germany
Blood Red Section Motorcycle Club
Brigade 81
Caballeros Motorcycle Club

Joker Motorcycle Club

Indonesia
Eight Demons Motorcycle Club

Kuwait
Desert Saints Motorcycle Club

Latvia
Bears Motorcycle Club
Old School MC

Netherlands
Flying Eagles Motorcycle Club
Waardeloos Motorcycle Club
Motorcycle Club Outsiders

Norway
Customizers Motorcycle Club
Four Horsemen Motorcycle Club
Screwdrivers Motorcycle Club
Shit Happens Motorcycle Club
Untouchables Motorcycle Club
Vanguards Motorcycle Club
Warriors Motorcycle Club

Poland
Fortress Motorcycle Club
Head Hunters Motorcycle Club
Red Indians Motorcycle Club
Red Skulls Motorcycle Club

Philippines
Bangads Motorcycle Club

Russia
Red & White Army Motorcycle Club
Seven Winds Motorcycle Club

Serbia
Messengers Motorcycle Club

Slovakia
Faraons Motorcycle Club

Spain
Road Demons Motorcycle Club

Sweden
Outbreak Motorcycle Club
Red and White Crew
Rednecks Motorcycle Club

Switzerland
Broncos Motorcycle Club
Kodiaks Motorcycle Club
Razorbacks Motorcycle Club

Thailand
Death Messengers Motorcycle Club
The original supporter in Thailand 

StreetCrew 81 Thailand

Stronghead 198 Thailand

Turkey
Red Warriors Motorcycle Club
Red Devils Motorcycle Club
Gray Wolves Motorcycle Club

Ukraine
Barbarian Motorcycle Club

United Kingdom
 Barbarians Motorcycle Club
 Confederates Motorcycle Club
 Instigators Motorcycle Club
 Predators Motorcycle Club, in Somerset
Red chiefs MC

United States
 Aliens MC Nomads, in New York City (patched over in 1969)
 Alky Haulers Motorcycle Club, in California<ref
name="auto2"></ref>
 Animals Motorcycle Club, in Cleveland, Ohio (patched over in 1967)
 Bastards Motorcycle Club
 Bishops Motorcycle Club
 BPM Motorcycle Club, in Minnesota false BPM is a sons of silence support club 
 Bridgerunners Motorcycle Club
 Brothers Motorcycle Club, in Anchorage, Alaska (patched over in 1982)
 Brothers Fast Motorycle Club, in Denver, Colorado (patched over in 2001)
 Chosen Brothers Mc (Indiana)
 Confederate Angels Motorcycle Club, in Richmond, Virginia (defunct)
 Deathmasters Motorcycle Club
 Demon Knights Motorcycle Club, in New York
 Desert Road Riders
 Desperado's Motorcycle Club
 Dirty Dozen Motorcycle Club, in Arizona (patched over in 1997)
 Forty Seven Mororcycle Club 
 Few Good Men Motorcycle Club
 Fossils Motorcycle Club
 Freemen Motorcycle Club
 Freewheelers Motorcycle Club
 Gooses Motorcycle Club, in Cleveland, Ohio (patched over in 1967)
 Grateful Dead Motorcycle Club, in Bridgeport, Connecticut (patched over in 1975)
 Hackers Motorcycle Club, in Rochester, New York (patched over in 1969)
 Hell's Henchmen Motorcycle Club, in Illinois and Indiana (patched over in 1994)
 Hellkats Motorcycle Club
 Hooligans MC, in Arizona
 Iron Cross Motorcycle Club
 Iron Range Motorcycle Club, in Eveleth, Minnesota
Kings of Mayhem Motorcycle Club
Longriders Motorcycle Club
Los Valientes Motorcycle Club
Lost Boys Motorcycle Club
Merciless Souls
Mercenaries No Land MC
Midgard Serpents
Mortal Skulls Motorcycle Club
 North Coast Motorcycle Club, in Akron, Ohio (patched over in 2015)
Northwoods Riders Motorcycle Club
Notorious Ryderz MC, Fresno CA
Ol'Timers Motorcycle Club
Rebel Rousers Motorcycle Club
Road Reapers Motorcycle Club
Saracens Motorcycle Club, in Turner, Maine
Satan's Soldiers
Scoundrels
 Sons of Hell MC, in Arizona and Washington
Street Legal Motorcycle Club
Themadones Motorcycle Club
Thunderbird Motorcycle Club
Undaunted Souls Motorcycle Club, in Rockland, New York
Unforgiven Motorcycle Club
Wolf Pack Motorcycle Club
Valhalla Motorcycle Club

References 

Support clubs